Mordor is a fictional location in J. R. R. Tolkien's fictional world of Middle-earth.

Mordor may also refer to:
 Mordor: The Depths of Dejenol, a 1995 role-playing video game;
 Mordor, Warsaw, an informal name for the area, mostly composed of the office buildings, in the city of Warsaw, Poland;
 Mordor Macula, an informal name of an area on Charon, a moon of Pluto.